Rhynchocalyx lawsonioides is a small flowering tree, the sole species of the genus Rhynchocalyx. It had also previously been regarded as the only species in the monogeneric family Rhynchocalycaceae but is now included in the expanded Penaeaceae along with Olinia (formerly of the Oliniaceae) under the APG III system of classification. Rhynchocalyx is endemic to the KwaZulu-Cape coastal forest mosaic ecoregion of the Natal and Eastern Cape provinces of South Africa.

References

 Schönenberger, J. and Conti, E., 2003. Molecular phylogeny and floral evolution of Penaeaceae, Oliniaceae, Rhynchocalycaceae, and Alzateaceae (Myrtales). American Journal of Botany 90: 293–309.

Monotypic Myrtales genera
Penaeaceae
Flora of the Cape Provinces
Flora of KwaZulu-Natal
Trees of South Africa
Vulnerable plants
Taxa named by Daniel Oliver